Pico Cristóbal Colón is the highest mountain in Colombia, with an estimated height of . Pico Cristóbal Colón and Pico Simón Bolívar are the two highest peaks in Colombia and are equal in elevation. One or the other of these peaks is therefore the fifth most prominent in the world (see list of peaks by prominence). There is a permanent snowcap on this peak and on the nearby mountains. It is part of the Sierra Nevada de Santa Marta range, along with Pico Simón Bolívar. The peak is named after Christopher Columbus.

Climbing history
Colón was first climbed in 1939 by Walter Wood, Anderson Bakerwell and E. Praolini.

Access to these mountains became very difficult after the early 1990s due to hostile locals, drug traffickers, and FARC guerillas. An expedition in 2015 led by John Biggar was one of the first to climb in the range for many years, and reached the summit of Pico Colón on 13 December.

See also
 List of mountains by elevation
 List of Ultras of South America

References

Cristobal Colon
Sierra Nevada de Santa Marta
Geography of Magdalena Department
Highest points of countries
Five-thousanders